Young Firpo (April 25, 1907 – August 21, 1984) was an American professional light-heavyweight boxer. He began his career in Burke, Idaho. He was a popular fighter in the Pacific Northwest during the 1920s and 1930s, particularly in Portland, Oregon. He was also a ranked Light-Heavyweight contender during the early 1930s.

Honors
 Inducted into the Idaho Sports Hall of Fame, March 15, 1974.
 Inducted into the World Boxing Hall of Fame: Class of 2008.

References

External links
Brief Refereeing Career in Portland, Oregon (1945)
 

1907 births
1984 deaths
Light-heavyweight boxers
People from Barre, Vermont
American people of Italian descent
Boxers from Idaho
American male boxers
Boxers from Vermont